This is a list of public holidays in Luxembourg.

Public holidays

The National Holiday celebrates the birthday of the Grand Duke and used to be movable to coincide with the actual birthday of monarch. To avoid cold weather on the January 5 birthday of Grand Duke Jean (reigned 1964-2000), the Grand Duke's Official Birthday celebration was pinned since 1962 to Jean's name day on June 23, and was maintained under the reign of his successor Henri.

Unofficial holidays

Good Friday (Friday before Easter Sunday) is a bank holiday, meaning that it is only a public holiday for bank employees.

Local complementary unofficial holidays may exist, like the Kermesse Day (known as Kiermes) that always fall on a Monday in the city of Luxembourg, or the Carnival Day also happening in the capital city.

References
Public Holidays, luxembourg.lu 
Jours fériés légaux au Grand-Duché de Luxembourg, luxembourg.lu 
Public holidays in Luxembourg, Banque de Luxembourg
Feiertage in Luxemburg, Banque de Luxembourg 
Jours fériés au Luxembourg, Banque de Luxembourg 
Grand-Ducal decree dated 23 December 1961 

 
Lux
Luxembourgian culture
Luxembourg-related lists